The Kingsbury County Courthouse, located on South Dakota Highway 25 in De Smet, South Dakota, was built in 1898.  It was listed on the National Register of Historic Places in 1977.

It is a two-and one-half story Renaissance Revival-style building, topped by a cupola.  It has a one-story flat-roofed porch on its front facade.  Modillions under the cornice encircle the building.

References

Courthouses on the National Register of Historic Places in South Dakota
Renaissance Revival architecture in South Dakota
Government buildings completed in 1898
Kingsbury County, South Dakota
Courthouses in South Dakota